Communications in the State of Palestine occur across many  media, including telephone, radio, television, and internet. The telecom infrastructure  is growing at a very rapid pace and continually being updated and expanded.

Telephone

 Country calling code: +970 or +972

There is one fixed line company - Paltel - with 363,000 customers

Mobile
There are 2 mobile operators in the Palestinian territories: Jawwal with two million customers, and Wataniya with 400,000 customers.

Radio
There are 25 licensed FM stations broadcasting in the Palestinian territories.

FM Stations
Ajyal - www.radioajyal.com
Raya - www.raya.fm
Sama - www.sama-fm.com
AlSharq - www.alsharq.ps

On October 1, 1999, the International Telecommunication Union assigned the call block E4A through E4Z to Palestine.  Aircraft tail numbers, amateur radio stations, vessels at sea and other radio facilities licensed by the Palestinian Authority will carry call signs beginning with "E4."

Internet

 Country code top-level domain (ccTLD): .PS
 Internet users:: More than 230,000 Paltel ADSL customers by the end of Q3 2014

Censorship
In 2008 opennet stated  "Access to Internet in the Palestinian territories remains relatively open, although social filtering of sexually explicit content has been implemented in Gaza. Internet in the West Bank remains almost entirely unfiltered, save for a single news Web site that was banned for roughly six months starting in late 2008. Media freedom is constrained in Gaza and the West Bank by the political upheaval and internal conflict as well as by the Israeli forces."

On 23 April 2012 EFF published a list of websites censored by some Palestinian ISPs.

On 23 April 2012 the Tor Project announced that they are witnessing politically motivated censorship in Bethlehem.

In May 2012, the Ma'an news agency stated "The Palestinian Authority has quietly instructed Internet providers to block access to news websites whose reporting is critical of President Mahmoud Abbas."

Mail

Palestine Post is responsible for providing postal service in West Bank, while the Ministry of Telecom and Information Technology of the State of Palestine is responsible for postal service in the Gaza Strip. Generally, international letters addressed to West Bank are routed through both Jordan and Israel and the international letters addressed to Gaza are routed through only Israel. Delays often happen during sending and receiving letters from Palestine. Without these two national postal authorities, no international courier service would be serving the areas.

Newspapers
 List of newspapers in Palestine

References

See also
Palestinian territories
Postage stamps and postal history of the Palestinian National Authority